Wilhelmus Johannes Maria Antonius Asselbergs (2 January 1903 in Bergen op Zoom – 27 June 1968 in Nijmegen), better known under his pseudonym Anton van Duinkerken, was  a Dutch poet, essayist, and academic.

Asselbergs considered a career as a priest before becoming a journalist, editing De Gids. He was subsequently a professor in art history and the history of literature at the Katholieke Universiteit Nijmegen. A Roman Catholic, he was active on behalf of the emancipation of the Catholic Church and wrote religious poetry.

In 1954 he became member of the Royal Netherlands Academy of Arts and Sciences.

He was honoured with a statue in the city of Bergen op Zoom.

References

External links

1903 births
1968 deaths
Dutch male poets
Dutch Roman Catholics
Dutch art historians
Dutch literary critics
Members of the Royal Netherlands Academy of Arts and Sciences
People from Bergen op Zoom
Academic staff of Radboud University Nijmegen
Constantijn Huygens Prize winners
P. C. Hooft Award winners
20th-century Dutch poets
20th-century Dutch male writers
20th-century Dutch historians